Giuseppe Montibeller (born 22 August 1964) is a former professional footballer who played as a forward. Born in Italy, he played his entire career in France and holds French citizenship.

Notes

References 

1964 births
Living people
Footballers from Apulia
Sportspeople from the Metropolitan City of Bari
Italian footballers
French footballers
French people of Italian descent
Naturalized citizens of France
Italian emigrants to France
Association football forwards
INF Vichy players
FC Rouen players
SC Abbeville players
FC Saint-Lô Manche players
Quimper Kerfeunteun F.C. players
AS Beauvais Oise players
US Avranches players
Angoulême Charente FC players
OFC Charleville players
CO Saint-Dizier players
French Division 3 (1971–1993) players
Ligue 2 players
Championnat National players
Championnat National 2 players